Novosemenkino is a rural locality (a selo) in Semenkinsky Selsoviet, Belebeyevsky District, Bashkortostan, Russia. The population was 295 as of 2010. There are 7 streets.

Geography 
Novosemenkino is located 38 km north of Belebey (the district's administrative centre) by road. Imyan-Kuper is the nearest rural locality.

References 

Rural localities in Belebeyevsky District